Vernonia arborea is a species of mid-level rainforest tree in the aster family (Asteraceae, or Compositae) that is found in Western Ghats of India and Sri Lanka and is also widespread in the East Indies. Another variety, V. a. javanica of Java (called Semboeng Kebo) almost as tall (111 feet, or 34 meters) is up to 3 ft 5 in (104 centimeters) thick: The most massive of all composites. Its leaves contain a fungicide.

References

External links
Asian plants

Flowers of India

arborea
Flora of tropical Asia